Bogʻdon (before 2014 Yangiqishloq) is an urban-type settlement in Jizzakh Region, Uzbekistan. It is the administrative center of Forish District. The town population in 1989 was 6,611 people.

References

Populated places in Jizzakh Region
Urban-type settlements in Uzbekistan